Streptomyces albidoflavus is a bacterium species from the genus  of Streptomyces which has been isolated from soil from Poland. Streptomyces albidoflavus produces dibutyl phthalate and streptothricins.

Small noncoding RNA 

Bacterial small RNAs are involved in post-transcriptional regulation. Using deep sequencing  S. albidoflavus transcriptome was analysed at the end of exponential growth. 63 small RNAs were identified. Expression of 11 of them was confirmed by Northern blot. The sRNAs were shown to be only present in Streptomyces species.

sRNA scr4677 (Streptomyces coelicolor sRNA 4677) is located in the intergenic region between anti-sigma factor SCO4677 gene and a putative regulatory protein gene SCO4676. scr4677 expression requires the SCO4677 activity and scr4677 sRNA itself seem to affect the levels of the SCO4676-associated transcripts.

Targets of two of S. albidoflavus noncoding RNAs have been  identified. Noncoding RNA of Glutamine Synthetase I was shown to modulate antibiotic production. The small RNA scr5239 (Streptomyces coelicolor sRNA upstream of SCO5239) has two targets. It inhibits agarase DagA expression by direct base pairing to the dagA coding region, and it represses translation of methionine synthase metE (SCO0985) at the 5' end of its open reading frame.

Fatty acid synthesis 
A crystal structure is available of the S. albidoflavus  S-malonyltransferase. S. albidoflavuss ACP S-MT is involved in both fatty acid synthesis II and polyketide synthase and is structurally similar to Escherichia colis analogue.

Usage in biotechnology 
Strains of S. albidoflavus produce various antibiotics, including actinorhodin, methylenomycin, undecylprodigiosin, and perimycin. Certain strains of S. albidoflavus can be used for heterologous protein expression.

DNA repair 
The Ku homolog is SCF55.25c. It contains an Shrimp alkaline phosphatase-like (SAP-like) domain at the C-terminus. S. albidoflavus produces a (putatively) single-domain protein SC9H11.09c which is homologous to the LigD NucDom which is common to many bacterial LigDs. (LigDs are a subfamily of DNA ligases. In bacteria many, but not all LigDs have additional nuclease domains branched from the universally present central ligase domain. If present - as in this case - the nuclease domain is an N-terminus extension.)

Genetics 
The genome consists of a single linear molecule, and although Ku would be expected to perform end maintenance, none has been observed so far.

See also 
 List of Streptomyces species

References

Further reading

External links
Type strain of Streptomyces albidoflavus at BacDive -  the Bacterial Diversity Metadatabase

albidoflavus
Bacteria described in 1948